Éric Lee Molina (born April 26, 1982) is a Mexican-American professional boxer. He has challenged twice for a world heavyweight title, in 2015 and 2016.

Professional career
Molina turned professional on March 17, 2007; losing his first professional bout by knockout. Despite losing his first pro bout, Molina went on an 18-fight unbeaten streak. On January 18, 2012, he stepped up and fought former two-time world heavyweight title challenger Chris Arreola. Despite losing the fight by first-round knockout, Molina did manage to hurt Arreola. Two and a half years later in May 2014, Molina scored his biggest professional career win by stopping former world heavyweight title challenger DaVarryl Williamson in five rounds.

On June 13, 2015, he fought for the WBC world heavyweight title against defending champion Deontay Wilder. Molina hurt the champion during the early rounds, but was knocked out in the ninth round. Molina scored the biggest win of his entire professional career in April 2016 by stopping former two-weight world champion Tomasz Adamek in the tenth round. Later that year, on December 10, he challenged for the IBF heavyweight title against champion Anthony Joshua in Manchester, England. Molina lost by third-round knockout.

On May 22, 2018, Molina was suspended from fighting in the United Kingdom for two years by the UK Anti-Doping organisation after testing positive for the prohibited substance dexamethasone, a substance that the World Anti-Doping Agency lists as being prohibited during the "in competition" period only, following his December 10, 2016 world title fight with Anthony Joshua. The suspension will run from the date of an imposed provisional suspension, which began on October 28, 2017, and will end at midnight on October 27, 2019.

On November 4, 2017, Molina, ranked #12 by the WBC at heavyweight, faced WBO #3, WBC #6 and IBF #7 Dominik Breazeale. In the eighth round, Breazeale caught Molina with a right hand to Molina's side of his head, which prompted Molina to take a knee. Molina managed to beat the count, but didn't look fit enough to continue. Despite making it to the end of the round, Molina's corner decided to stop the fight.

On December 7, 2019, Molina faced Filip Hrgovic, ranked #9 by the WBA and the IBF and #11 by the WBC. Hrgovic dominated the fight, and finished Molina in the third.

In his next fight, Molina fought heavyweight prospect Fabio Wardley. Molina caught Wardley with a right hand in the fifth round, which prompted Wardley to retaliate and floor Molina. Molina would not beat the count and Wardley was awarded the KO win against Molina.

Professional boxing record

References

External links

Eric Molina - Profile, News Archive & Current Rankings at Box.Live

American boxers of Mexican descent
American sportspeople in doping cases
Boxers from Texas
Doping cases in boxing
Heavyweight boxers
Cruiserweight boxers
1982 births
Living people
American male boxers
People from Willacy County, Texas